Salingathu (also known as Abdullah Shah 1455–1502), was King of Arakan from 1494 to 1502. The King, who came to power by overthrowing his eight-year-old nephew, Ran Aung, was extremely cautious about his personal security. He strictly regulated the schedule by which the gates of the palace and the city could be kept open. He employed many Household Guards in the Palace and around the capital, and always traveled with an extensive security detail. His chief Queen was Saw Mi Saw, daughter of King Ba Saw Phyu. He died of natural causes in 1502 at age 46. He was succeeded by his son Raza.

References

Bibliography
 

Monarchs of Mrauk-U
1455 births
1502 deaths
15th century in Burma
15th-century Burmese monarchs
16th-century Burmese monarchs